Quantum of Solace is a 2008 James Bond film.

Quantum of Solace can also refer to several topics related to James Bond:
"Quantum of Solace" (short story), from the For Your Eyes Only short story collection by Ian Fleming
Quantum of Solace (soundtrack), the soundtrack to the film
007: Quantum of Solace, the video game based on the film